This is a list of interurban railways in North America. Elsewhere, the term was not used or did not have the same meaning. The vast majority of these systems are defunct.  All were opened primarily as passenger carriers, although many survived as freight railways after passenger service ceased.

Canada
Provinces not listed did not have interurban systems, which were commonly called radial railways in Canada.

Alberta

British Columbia

Manitoba

Nova Scotia

Ontario

Quebec

Cuba

Mexico

United States

Alabama

Arizona

Arkansas

California

Colorado

Connecticut

Delaware

District of Columbia

Georgia

Idaho

Illinois

Indiana

Iowa

Kansas

Kentucky

Louisiana

Maine

Maryland

Massachusetts

Michigan
Michigan had  of interurban.

Minnesota

Mississippi

Missouri

Montana

Nebraska

New Hampshire

New Jersey

New York

North Carolina

North Dakota

Ohio

Oklahoma

Oregon

Pennsylvania

Puerto Rico

Rhode Island

South Carolina

South Dakota

Tennessee

Texas

Utah

Vermont

Virginia

Washington

West Virginia

Wisconsin

Wyoming

See also
 List of town tramway systems in North America (covers countries other than U.S. and Canada)
 List of street railways in Canada
 List of town tramway systems in the United States

References

 
Canada transport-related lists
Cuba transport-related lists
Mexico transportation-related lists
Rail